Garmeh Khush (also Romanized as Garmeh Khūsh; also known as Garmeh) is a village in Ruin Rural District, in the Central District of Esfarayen County, North Khorasan Province, Iran. At the 2006 census, its population was 460, in 93 families.

References 

Populated places in Esfarayen County